The 1989 Sharjah Cup was held in Sharjah, UAE, between March 23–24, 1989. Two national teams took part: Pakistan and Sri Lanka.

The beneficiaries of the series were Abdul Qadir and Salahuddin.

Matches

See also
 Sharjah Cup

References

Notes

Sources
 
 Cricket Archive: Sharjah Cup 1988/89
 ESPNCricinfo: Sharjah Cup, 1988/89
 

International cricket competitions from 1988–89 to 1991
Sharjah Cup, 1989
1989 in Emirati sport
International cricket competitions in the United Arab Emirates